Histoire de la Commune de 1871 is a history of the Paris Commune by Prosper-Olivier Lissagaray. Published in 1876, it is the event's definitive eyewitness assessment. It was later translated into English and German.

Publication 

Lissagaray participated in the Paris Commune and, in popular myth, had been called the "last man on the barricades". Exiled in London after the fall, Lissagaray started on his history. He first published a short sketch of what would become his Histoire at the end of 1871, entitled Les huit journée de mai derrière les barricades, with Le Petit Journal in Brussels. It was first published by Henry Kistemaeckers in 1876. Lissagaray's father-in-law, Karl Marx, was a strong advocate for the work's translation into German and pursued a potential simultaneous release in the language. Marx considered the book the "first authentic" account of the event and was involved in vetting the German translator despite previously having ill will towards Lissagaray. After reviewing a sample translation, they chose Isolde Kurz for the German translation.

The book was translated and released in German in 1878 and republished in 1891 and 1894. The English translation released in 1886. Its translator, Eleanor Marx, and Lissagaray were previously engaged. After publishing the book, Lissagaray was estimated to have worked on revising the book with new research, material, and writing for the next 25 years. His definitive edition was released in 1898. Lissagaray died in 1901.

Legacy 

Histoires became the definitive eyewitness assessment of the Paris Commune. Lissagaray became known for the work.

References

Bibliography

External links 

 
 English full text (html file)

1876 non-fiction books
French-language books
Works about the Paris Commune